Mouhamadou N'Diaye (born 24 August 1994) is a Senegalese footballer who most recently played as a forward for Saudi Second Division club Al-Rayyan.

Club career
In March 2014, N'Diaye moved on a season-long deal to Norwegian top flight team Bodø/Glimt.

In February 2016, N'Diaye moved to OBOS-ligaen team Fredrikstad.

In July 2017, N'Diaye moved to OBOS-ligaen team Elverum.

In February 2018 he joined First Professional League team Dunav Ruse on a two and a half year contract.

Career statistics

References

External links
Bodø/Glimt Profile

1988 births
Living people
Senegalese footballers
Association football forwards
FK Bodø/Glimt players
Eliteserien players
Fredrikstad FK players
FC Dunav Ruse players
Stade de Mbour players
Al-Rayyan Club (Saudi Arabia) players
Norwegian First Division players
First Professional Football League (Bulgaria) players
Saudi Second Division players
Senegalese expatriate footballers
Expatriate footballers in the Czech Republic
Senegalese expatriate sportspeople in the Czech Republic
Expatriate footballers in Norway
Senegalese expatriate sportspeople in Norway
Expatriate footballers in Bulgaria
Expatriate footballers in Saudi Arabia
Senegalese expatriate sportspeople in Saudi Arabia